Bílá Hlína is a municipality and village in Mladá Boleslav District in the Central Bohemian Region of the Czech Republic. It has about 100 inhabitants.

Etymology
The name means "white clay" and is derived from the white clay soil where the village was founded.

Geography
It lies in the Jizera Table. Most of the municipal territory is formed by the Klokočka deer park.

History
Bílá Hlína was founded in 1712 and belongs to the youngest villages in the region.

Sights
There are no cultural monuments.

References

External links

Villages in Mladá Boleslav District